Mill Avenue Historic District is a national historic district located at Jacksonville, Onslow County, North Carolina.  The district encompasses 31 contributing buildings, 1 contributing site, and 1 contributing structure in a predominantly residential section of Jacksonville.  The district developed after 1890 and includes notable examples of Late Victorian and Bungalow / American Craftsman style architecture. Notable contributing buildings include the Jarman Hotel (c. 1890), Jacksonville Depot, Richard Ward House (c. 1890), Richard Ward Guest House, the Lockamy-Chadwick House, George Bender House (1901), Samuel Ambrose House, the Marine House, Steve Aman House, and the Henrietta Jarman House.

It was listed on the National Register of Historic Places in 1990.

References

Historic districts on the National Register of Historic Places in North Carolina
Victorian architecture in North Carolina
Buildings and structures in Onslow County, North Carolina
National Register of Historic Places in Onslow County, North Carolina